The western carp gudgeon (Hypseleotris klunzingeri) is one of several carp gudgeon species. Carp gudgeons are very small perciform fish (similar in size, shape and colour) found in the Australian Murray-Darling River system, mainly in lowland environments, but some have been observed in upland environments. They are often found in small creeks, as well as billabongs and the edges of larger rivers.  They prefer water 1 to 2 m deep with aquatic weed and structure provided by rocks or sunken timber (usually the latter).

Like many other Murray-Darling native fish species, western carp gudgeon have crossed the Great Dividing Range through natural river capture events and are found in a number of East Coast drainages, from the Hunter River system in northern New South Wales to the Fitzroy River system in central Queensland.

Description
Western carp gudgeon are small fish, averaging 30–40 mm long, though very large specimens may approach 60 mm.  Usually, their bodies are yellowish to clear with subtle, dark grey blotches, with semitranslucent fins.  Males develop spectacular spawning colours in summer, namely a more metallic-bronze body colour with a red stripe through the caudal (tail), anal, and spiny and soft dorsal fins.  The red stripe through the anal and spiny and soft dorsal fins are topped with a tiny iridescent blue-white stripe, which are somewhat subtle on most of the fins, but are prominent and eye-catching on the spiny dorsal fin.

Western carp gudgeons spawn in summer, attaching eggs to aquatic weed in the shallows.  They may have suffered from small variations in river level caused by river regulation, which exposes and destroys eggs laid in shallows.  They may be a critical food item for juvenile Murray cod, and likely are an important forage fish for larger fish species in many waterways.  Western carp gudgeons have taken to lower-altitude, man-made lakes and impoundments in the Murray-Darling system well, and are very common in some.

In aquaria
Western carp gudgeon make superb aquarium fish: they are lively, interactive, attractively coloured, and hardy.  They eagerly take live or frozen brine shrimp, very small invertebrates, and commercial micropellet fish feeds.  Curiously, they are unavailable in aquarium stores and remain the province of keen naturalists who capture their own.

Classification
The specific name honours the German physician and zoologist Carl Benjamin Klunzinger (1834-1914), who, in 1880, mistook this species for Eleotris cyprinoides.

Western carp gudgeon are purportedly the most common of the carp gudgeons.  However, recent genetic research suggests that the carp gudgeons are a cryptic species complex composed of at least four species and many hybrids; their taxonomy is extremely complicated, unresolved, and not accurately reflected by current scientific and common names. Many researchers have now resorted to referring to them as simply "carp gudgeon (Hypseleotris spp.)" until their taxonomy is resolved.

Despite their common name, carp gudgeon are in no way related to carp (Cyprinus carpio) or other members of the family Cyprinidae.

Introduced Parasite
The introduced parasite Asian fish tapeworm Bothriocephalus acheilognathi had caused significant fish kills of the species in Canberra's Lake Burley Griffin and is strongly suspected of affecting other Australian native freshwater fish.

Uniparental genome elimination

Most animals reproduce sexually, that is by a process of fusion of haploid gametes that arise by meiosis in each of two different parents.  Meiosis ordinarily involves genetic recombination.  However, male and female hybrids of Australian carp gudgeons (Hypseleotris) are fertile, but practice asexual reproduction and display uniparental chromosomal elimination without genetic recombination.  This process is termed hybridogenesis.  In these fish hybridogenesis occurs through premeiotic genome duplication of the parental genome to be transmitted, while the second parental genome appears to be gradually eliminated during development in juvenile individuals.

References

 
 
 Bertozzi, T., Adams, M. and Walker, K.F.  (2000)  Species boundaries in carp gudgeons (Eleotrididae: Hypseleotris) from the River Murray, South Australia: evidence for multiple species and extensive hybridization.  Marine and Freshwater Research 51: 805–815.

External links 
 Native Fish Australia

western carp gudgeon
Murray-Darling basin
Taxa named by James Douglas Ogilby
Freshwater fish of Australia
western carp gudgeon